Lawrence Baker (June 18, 1890 – October 14, 1980) was an American tennis administrator and player.

Baker was born in Lowndesville, South Carolina. In 1930 he was chairman of the Chevy Chase Club in Chevy Chase, Maryland, and he was president of the United States Tennis Association from 1948 to 1950. He was captain of the United States team at the 1953 Davis Cup. Baker was general counsel for the United States Tennis Association until 1970. He was inducted into the International Tennis Hall of Fame in the contributor category in 1975.

Baker died in October 1980, at the age of 90.

References

External links 

1890 births
1980 deaths
People from South Carolina
American male tennis players
International Tennis Hall of Fame inductees
Sports executives and administrators
Tennis executives
20th-century American people
Tennis people from South Carolina